Amida was an ancient city in Mesopotamia located where modern Diyarbakır, Turkey now stands.

The city was located on the right bank of the Tigris. The walls are lofty and substantial, and constructed of the recycled stones from older buildings.

History 
Amid(a) was established as an Aramean settlement, circa the 3rd millennium BC, later as the capital of Bit-Zamani. The oldest artefact from Amida is the famous stele of king Naram-Sin also believed to be from third millennia BC. The name Amida first appears in the writings of Assyrian King Adad-nirari I (C. 1310 -1281 BC) who ruled the city as a part of the Assyrian homeland. Amida remained an important region of the Assyrian homeland throughout the reign of king Tiglath-Pileser I (1114–1076 BC) and the name Amida appeared in the annals of Assyrian rulers until 705 BC, and also appears in the archives of Armenian king Tiridates II in 305 AD, and the Roman historian Ammianus Marcellinus (325–391 AD).

It was enlarged and strengthened by Constantius II, in whose reign it was besieged and taken after seventy-three days by the Sassanid king Shapur II (359). The Roman soldiers and a large part of the population of the town were massacred by the Persians. The historian Ammianus Marcellinus, who took part in the defence of the town, has given a minute account of the siege. The Persians did not attempt to garrison the city after the siege.

Amida was besieged by the Sassanid king Kavadh I during the Anastasian War through the autumn and winter (502-503). The siege of the city proved to be a far more difficult enterprise than Kavadh expected; the defenders, although unsupported by troops, repelled the Sassanid assaults for three months before they were finally beaten. Part of the prisoners of Amida were deported to Arrajan, a city refounded by Kavad I, who then named it "Weh-az-Amid-Kawad" (literally, "better than Amida, Kavad [built this]". During that same war, the Romans attempted an ultimately unsuccessful siege of the Persian-held Amida, led by generals Patricius and Hypatius. In 504, however, the Byzantines reconquered the city, and Justinian I repaired its walls and fortifications.

The Sassanids captured the city for a third time in 602 and held it for more than twenty years. In 628 the Roman emperor Heraclius recovered Amida.

Finally, in 639 the city was captured by the Arab armies of Islam and it remained in Arab hands until the Kurdish dynasty of the Marwanids ruled the area during the 10th and 11th centuries.

In 1085, the Seljuq Turks captured the region from the Marwanids, and they settled many Turcomans in the region. However, the Ayyubids received the city from their vassal State the Artiquids in 1232, and the city ruled by them until the Mongolian Ilkhanate captured the city in 1259. Later the Ayyubids of hasankeyf Took back the city and ruled it until it was sacked by the Timurid Empire in 1394. Yavuz Sultan Selim, the Ottoman Emperor received the city from the Safavids in 1515.

Amida is a diocese of several Christian denominations; for the ecclesiastical history of Amida and Diyarbakir, see the Diyarbakır article.

See also
 Diyarbakır
 Siege of Amida
 Ephraim of Antioch, Church Father born in Amida

Notes

References 

 George Long, "Amida", in William Smith, Dictionary of Greek and Roman Geography, Volume 1, Walton & Maberly, 1854, p. 122.

 Matthew Bennett, "Amida", The Hutchinson dictionary of ancient & medieval warfare, Taylor & Francis, 1998, p. 13.

Roman towns and cities in Greece
History of Diyarbakır
Catholic titular sees in Asia
Populated places of the Byzantine Empire
Populated places in ancient Upper Mesopotamia